The notable whiptail, notable rattail or longnose rattail, Coelorinchus innotabilis, is a species of rattail found around southern Australia, and New Zealand, at depths of between 500 and 1,500 m.  Its length is between 15 and 32 cm.

References

 
 Tony Ayling & Geoffrey Cox, Collins Guide to the Sea Fishes of New Zealand,  (William Collins Publishers Ltd, Auckland, New Zealand 1982) 

Macrouridae
Fish described in 1907